Denis James Madden (born March 8, 1940) is an American prelate of the Roman Catholic Church, who served as an auxiliary bishop of the Archdiocese of Baltimore, Maryland from 2005 to 2015.

Biography

Early life
Denis Madden was born on March 8, 1940, to William and Anna (née Burnakis) Madden in Carbondale, Pennsylvania; his father was of Irish descent and his mother of Lithuanian descent,  He later entered the Order of St. Benedict, and received his undergraduate degree at St. Benedict's College in Atchison, Kansas.

Ordination and ministry
Madden was ordained to the priesthood for the Order of St. Benedict by Bishop Lawrence Casey on April 1, 1967. Madden attended Columbia University in New York City, where he obtained a Master of Psychology degree, and the University of Notre Dame in Notre Dame, Indiana earning a Doctor of Clinical Psychology degree In 1973, Madden assumed a post in the psychology program at the University of Maryland in Baltimore, Maryland concurrently working as a marriage and family counselor for Associated Catholic Charities. He taught as a professor at the University of Maryland School of Medicine, and provided counseling to the clergy and religious of the archdiocese as well.  After about nine years as a Benedictine, Madden was allowed to leave the order and become incardinated with the Archdiocese of Baltimore.

After co-founding the humanitarian organization Accord Foundation, Madden became  director of the Pontifical Mission for Palestine office in Jerusalem from 1994 to 1996, He was then appointed associate secretary general of the Catholic Near East Welfare Association (CNEWA).  While at CNEWA, Madden was part of the long delayed 1992 restoration of the dome and the rotunda inside the Church of the Holy Sepulchre in Jerusalem

Auxiliary Bishop of Baltimore
On May 10, 2005, Madden was appointed auxiliary bishop of the Archdiocese of Baltimore and titular bishop of Baia by Pope Benedict XVI. He was the new pope's first episcopal appointment in the United States. Madden was consecrated on August 24, 2005, by Cardinal William Keeler, with Bishops William Malooly and Mitchell T. Rozanski serving as co-consecrators. Madden chose as his episcopal motto, In All Things May God Be Glorified, a phrase taken from The Rule of St. Benedict. Madden was also given the additional role of urban vicar for the fifty parishes in Baltimore.

Madden served as the Neumann vicar, responsible for parishes in the City of Baltimore, Baltimore County and Harford County. He also served as interim rector of the Basilica of the National Shrine of the Assumption of the Blessed Virgin Mary in Baltimore. Madden is a licensed clinical psychologist in both Maryland and Washington, D.C.

Retirement 
On March 8, 2015, Madden reached age 75 and was required by canon law to submit a letter of resignation to Pope Francis.  The pope accepted his retirement on December 5, 2016.  Though Madden was officially retired, Archbishop William Lori asked him to continue as vicar general and urban vicar.  In September 2021, the archdiocese announced that Madden was retiring as urban vicar.

See also
 

 Catholic Church hierarchy
 Catholic Church in the United States
 Historical list of the Catholic bishops of the United States
 List of Catholic bishops of the United States
 Lists of patriarchs, archbishops, and bishops

References

External links
 Archdiocese of Baltimore

Episcopal succession

1940 births
Living people
People from Carbondale, Pennsylvania
American Roman Catholic clergy of Irish descent
American people of Lithuanian descent
21st-century American psychologists
Columbia University alumni
University of Notre Dame alumni
American Benedictines
Former Benedictines
21st-century Roman Catholic bishops in the United States
Catholics from Pennsylvania
Benedictine College alumni
20th-century American psychologists